Wiang Chai may refer to:
 Wiang Chai District
 Wiang Chai Subdistrict